John Albert Janisch (March 15, 1920  – August 29, 1992) was an American professional basketball player. Janisch played for the Detroit Falcons, Boston Celtics, and Providence Steamrollers in the Basketball Association of America. He also played for the Flint Dow A.C.'s in the National Basketball League.

BAA career statistics

Regular season

References

External links

1920 births
1992 deaths
American men's basketball players
Basketball players from Indiana
Boston Celtics players
Detroit Falcons (basketball) players
Flint Dow A.C.'s players
Forwards (basketball)
Guards (basketball)
High school basketball coaches in the United States
Providence Steamrollers players
Valparaiso Beacons men's basketball players